Ida Bothe was an artist and educator in the 19th century. Born in Germany, Bothe moved to Boston, Massachusetts, ca.1880s. She exhibited work in the Boston Art Club, 1881 (a black-and-white "study head ... as masculine as, or even more so than, anything of a similar kind shown by the sterner sex"); and the National Academy of Design (1884-1885). She established a reputation as a painter ("a new and remarkably vital talent.") Bothe taught art at Wellesley College, 1882-1890. In 1890 she married Baron Ehrenfried von Voss and returned to Germany, to "Cunnersdorf, bei Hirschberg, Schlesien."

References

Further reading

 An art teacher's romance. Boston Traveller, April 15; reprinted in New York Times, April 20, 1890.

19th-century German people
German artists
American art educators